State Highway 115 (SH 115) is a state highway in the U.S. state of Colorado. SH 115's southern terminus is at U.S. Route 50 (US 50) interchange in northern Cañon City, and the northern terminus is at Interstate 25 (I-25), US 24 and US 87 in Colorado Springs.

Route description

Major construction has been done on the mountainous portion of the highway due to a high number of accidents because of lane narrowing. Highway 115 passes through several small towns along the eastern mountains including Florence and Penrose. It is the only highway that directly connects Colorado Springs to Cañon City.  The Highway Starts in Downtown Cañon City at US 50.  It then crosses the Arkansas River and leaves the city.  In Florence, SH 115 Overlaps SH 67 from Pikes Peak Avenue to Robinson Avenue.  As it leaves Florence, SH-115 encounters the western end of SH 120 and once again, crosses the Arkansas River.  In Penrose, the route, once again, intersects US-50.  SH 115 then becomes an expressway, with  interchanges at O'Connell Boulevard, South Academy Boulevard, and Lake Avenue as it enters Colorado Springs.  It ends at I-25 in Colorado Springs.

History
The route was established in the 1920s, when it connected US 50 near Florence to Colorado Springs. By 1950, the west terminus was fixed to SH 120. The US 50 interchange was built by 1977, when the entire route was paved. A small change in the routing near its east end occurred in 2007.

Major intersections

References

External links

115
Transportation in Fremont County, Colorado
Transportation in El Paso County, Colorado
Transportation in Colorado Springs, Colorado
Cañon City, Colorado